The Lonzahörner (3,560 m) are a multi-summited mountain of the Bernese Alps, located east of Blatten in the canton of Valais. They lie east of the Breithorn (Blatten), on the range between the Lötschental and the Oberaletsch Glacier.

References

External links
 Lonzahörner on Hikr

Bernese Alps
Mountains of the Alps
Alpine three-thousanders
Mountains of Switzerland
Mountains of Valais